Jochen Zeitz (born 6 April 1963) is the president, CEO and chairman of the board of Harley-Davidson, Inc. He is also CEO and Chairman of LiveWire Inc..Before that, he served as the chairman and CEO of Puma for 18 years. He also served as board member of Kering, the luxury goods company and chaired their Sustainability Committee, for whom he developed its global sustainability strategy. Zeitz is currently a board member of Harley Davidson, The B Team and Cranemere. In addition to this, Zeitz previously served on the board of Wilderness Safaris. Jochen Zeitz is also the co-founder of The B Team with Sir Richard Branson, Zeitz MOCAA and Founder of the Zeitz Foundation to support sustainable solutions that balance conservation, community, culture and commerce, and The Long Run.

Early life
Zeitz was born in Mannheim, Germany. He studied in Germany, Italy, France, and the United States, and graduated from the European Business School in International Marketing and Finance.

Career
Zeitz began his professional career with Colgate-Palmolive in New York and Hamburg. He joined PUMA in 1990, and in 1993 was appointed Chairman and CEO, becoming the youngest CEO in German history to head a public company at the age of 30. He then spearheaded the worldwide restructuring of PUMA, which was in financial difficulties at the time, and implemented a long-term development plan  t hat saw PUMA's share price gain around 4000 percent  in 13 years, from 8.6 Euros in his first year as CEO to an all-time high of 350 Euros  when the majority stake of the company was acquired by Kering in 2007. Zeitz turned PUMA from a failing company into one of the top three sporting goods brands in the world. After acquiring PUMA, Jochen Zeitz then joined Kering as a board member.

In 2008, Zeitz introduced PUMAVision, an ethical framework defined by the four key principles of being fair, honest, positive and creative as applied to all professional behaviour, business procedures and relationships throughout and outside of PUMA. Zeitz conceived of the Environmental Profit & Loss Account (E P&L). In May 2011 he announced PUMA's Environmental Profit & Loss Account, which puts a monetary value to a businesses use of ecosystem services across the entire supply chain. From 2010 to 2012, Zeitz was CEO of the Sport & Lifestyle division, which included PUMA and Volcom, and its Chief Sustainability Officer (CSO), then a Director of Kering and Chairman of the Board's sustainable development committee.

In 2014, Zeitz co-founded The B Team with Sir Richard Branson, an initiative which brings together the world’s top business leaders to promote socially and environmentally conscious business practices across the globe. Zeitz is also a board member of The B Team, Cranemere, the Kenya Wildlife Service (KWS).

Zeitz is now the Chairman, President and CEO of Harley-Davidson. He has been a member of the Board of Directors of Harley-Davidson since 2007 and served as the Chair of Harley-Davidson’s Sustainability Committee since its inception in 2011.

Known for “proven turnaround” skills  Zeitz assumed the helm of Harley-Davidson first as interim CEO in February 2020 and took over the job permanently in May 2020. In July, Zeitz announced The Rewire which led to a new five-year strategic plan called The Hardwire. The Rewire included prioritizing markets that matter and enhancing core strengths of the company while balancing expansion into new spaces. The Hardwire strategy includes a new pre-owned motorcycle program; investment in the parts, accessories, riding geal and financial services segments of the business; and a new division focused exclusively on electric motorcycles. In a subsequent financial filing Harley-Davidson Inc. reported better-than-expected results in a sign that its turnaround plan was taking hold.

In February 2021, inspired by KKR & Co Inc executive Pete Stavros, Zeitz announced the motorcycle maker would give stock grants to employees, including hourly and factory workers, to align with executives and shareholders.

In December 2021, Zeitz announced LiveWire, the electric-motorcycle division of Harley-Davidson, will become a separate publicly traded company to “operate with the same agility and speed as a startup.” The company went public on the NYSE on September 27, 2022. On the day of listing, Zeitz was the first CEO to ring the opening and closing bell of trading on the NYSE, also being the first to run two public-listed companies. Zeitz serves as LiveWire’s chairman and CEO for up to two years as it searches for a permanent leader. Zeitz is credited with bringing the company’s first electric model (Harley-Davidson LiveWireTM) to fruition in 2019.

In 2023, The Hardwire is now in its third year of implementation and since its launch, the company has not missed quarterly earnings.

Philanthropy
In 2008 Zeitz founded the not-for-profit Zeitz Foundation for Intercultural Ecosphere Safety to support creative and innovative sustainable projects and solutions that balance conservation, community development, culture, and commerce (the "4Cs") in a quadruple bottom line approach, promoting an inclusive, holistic paradigm of conservation that enhances livelihoods and fosters intercultural dialogue while building sustainable businesses. Owner of Segera (an eco-safari retreat and founding Long Run Destination), Zeitz also preserves 50,000 acres of wildlife habitat in Kenya which follows this holistic 4C philosophy to sustainably support its local communities and provide a safe refuge for endangered wildlife.

Founded by Jochen Zeitz and the ZEITZ foundation in 2009, The Long Run is a membership organisation of nature-based tourism businesses that are committed to driving sustainability through a holistic 4C philosophy. Safeguarding over 21 million acres of nature in 22 different countries, touching the lives of over 750,000 people and protecting over 30,000 plant and animal species, The Long Run has become the largest organisation of its kind worldwide. Zeitz is also Vice-President of Fauna and Flora International.

Zeitz Museum of Contemporary Art Africa 
The Zeitz Collection was founded in 2002. Since 2008 it has committed to becoming one of the most representative collections of contemporary art from the African continent and its diaspora. The Zeitz Collection bought 85 works at the 2013 Venice Biennale, including the award-winning installation at the Angola pavilion by artist Edson Chagas, a series of photographs by Zanele Muholi from the South Africa pavilion, and three large sculptures by Michele Mathison in the Zimbabwe pavilion.

In partnership with the Victoria & Alfred Waterfront, Zeitz founded the Zeitz Museum of Contemporary Art Africa (Zeitz MOCAA), located in the historic grain silo in Cape Town's Victoria & Alfred Waterfront. The museum features 9,500 square meters (102,000 square feet) of space over nine floors, including 6,000 square meters (65,000 square feet) for displays. In 2014, Thomas Heatherwick was chosen to design the conversion of the 1920s granary into a museum, including 80 galleries, 18 education rooms, a rooftop sculpture garden as well as storage and conservation areas, a restaurant, a coffee shop, and bookstores. The official public opening of the museum took place in September 2017. The opening ceremony was presided over by Archbishop Emeritus Desmond Tutu. In the first year of opening the Zeitz MOCAA was visited by over 300,000 people and named one of the best museums in the world by the Time Magazine.

Writing and film
In 2010, Zeitz co-wrote and published Prayer, Profit and Principles – Monk and Manager in dialogue with Anselm Grün, a Benedictine monk. The book has been translated into 15 languages and covers topics such as sustainability, the economy and prosperity, culture, values, success and responsibility.

In 2014 Zeitz co-wrote and published The Breakthrough Challenge: 10 Ways to Connect Today's Profits with Tomorrow's Bottom Line with John Elkington.

In 2021, Zeitz served as Executive Producer of the film Breaking Boundaries. This documentary film, narrated by Sir David Attenborough, breaks down the climate thresholds needed for the survival of the planet and humanity. The ten-minute trailer was screened to world leaders at the Biden Climate Summit in April 2021, and was released globally on Netflix in June 2021.

Zeitz also served as Producer on the award-winning documentary film ‘Ranger'. Set within Kenya’s Maasai homeland, an intimate and contemporary story of self-discovery unfolds as 12 women become East Africa’s first all-female anti-poaching unit. Upending the male-dominated world of military-style ranger training, these women instead undergo an extensive program of deep trauma-release and healing, triggering profound transformation within themselves and sending shockwaves through their communities. The acclaimed film was accepted into 14 Film Festivals and won Best Documentary Feature at the 2023 Sedona International Film Festival.

Honors and awards
Zeitz has received the "Strategist of the Year" three times from the Financial Times, "Entrepreneur of the Year", “Trendsetter of the Year” and “Best of European Business Award 2006″. In 2004, he was awarded the Federal Cross of Merit of Germany. In 2009, he was named Honorary Warden of Kenya by the Kenya Wildlife Service. In 2010, the German Sustainability Foundation gave Zeitz an award for Germany's most sustainable future strategies. He was named a Conde Nast Traveler “Visionaries 2012” and one of Fast Company’s “10 Most Important Players at the Rio +20 Conference”. He received the 2012 German Image Award, the 2013 Banksia International Award and the Visionary Award for the 2013 Travel + Leisure Global Vision Award. In 2015 he was awarded the Special Advocacy Award for Responsible Capitalism.> The award ceremony was held at Lancaster House in London, and presented by Sajid Javid, Secretary of State for Business, Innovation and Skills. In the same year, he was ranked #18 of "The World's Top 100 Compassionate Business Leaders" by Salt Magazine and awarded for his advocacy of Responsible Capitalism by FIRST Magazine. In 2016, the Zoological Society of London honoured Zeitz as a ZSL Conservation Fellow. In 2017, Zeitz was named #26 in OOOM's "The World's Most Inspiring People" list. In 2019, Conde Nast Traveler named Zeitz as one of “The 44 People Changing the Way We Travel”.

References

External links
 Board of Management - PUMA AG
 Who is Who: Jochen Zeitz (in German)
 Zeitz Foundation for Intercultural Ecosphere Safety
 The Long Run
 Zeitz family history (in German)

1963 births
Businesspeople from Mannheim
Living people
Recipients of the Cross of the Order of Merit of the Federal Republic of Germany
German art collectors